Joel Lion (born 1964) is an Israeli diplomat, he serves currently as  Ambassador Extraordinary and Plenipotentiary of the State of Israel to the Republic of Armenia and to the Republic of Moldova with residence in Jerusalem. He is the former Ambassador of the State of Israel to Ukraine.

From May 2017 to August 2018, he served as the Chief of Diplomatic Staff of the Deputy Minister of Foreign Affairs Tzipi Hotovely.

Joel Lion joined the Ministry of Foreign Affairs in 1993.

Biography

Joel Lion is the son of Alain Lion and Helene Becher. He was born in 1964 in France and raised in Esch-sur-Alzette in Luxembourg. Mr. Lion is married to Rivka, and is the father of eight children.

From September 2016 to October 2017 he served as the Special envoy for Holocaust issues and the return of Jewish assets from the Holocaust era. In that position he worked to coordinate the work between the WJRO and the State of Israel.

Before from October 2014 to September 2016, he was Director of 

the Public & Academic Affairs Department at the Media and Public Affairs Division of the Israeli Ministry of Foreign Affairs in Jerusalem. 
From August 2011 to August 2014, Lion served Consul-General of the State of Israel in Montreal, with jurisdiction on Quebec and the Atlantic provinces, and also as the Permanent Representative of his country to ICAO, the International Civil Aviation Organization.
 
Prior to being appointed Consul General in Montreal, he served as the Spokesperson and Consul for Media Affairs at the Consulate General of Israel in New York. He assumed this post in August 2009, and has been responsible for maintaining direct contact with America’s national and local media in the tri-state area, before New York he served as Deputy Director for the Western European Department at the Ministry of Foreign Affairs in Jerusalem, and was responsible for political relations with Germany. Previously, he was Counselor, Head of the Public Affairs Department at Israel’s Embassy in Berlin. He also served as Deputy Chief of Mission Latvia, Estonia and Lithuania at the Israeli Embassy in Riga and was Charge D' Affaires for Slovakia at the Israeli Embassy in Vienna. 
Before joining the Ministry of Foreign Affairs, Joel Lion has worked for the JNF-KKL in Jerusalem, as well as the Ministry of Religious Affairs.

Lion served in the Israel Defense Forces and attained the rank of Sergeant-Major in the Artillery Corps.

Special Missions 

In 1999, he became the first Israeli official to partake in the mission of election monitoring with the Organization for Security and Cooperation in Europe.

At the start of the second Intifada in 2001, Mr. Lion operated as Spokesman with the MFA special team in Bethlehem.

During operation "Cast Lead", he worked as director in charge of the MFA Press Center in Sderot.

During the Russia-Ukraine War (2022) he headed Israel's Emergency Response Team in Moldova, dealing with the Ukrainian Refugee crisis.

Education

In addition to his diplomatic career, Joel Lion has an extensive academic background. He earned his B.A. in Political Sciences from Hebrew University in 1988, and received his M.A. in History from the University of Latvia in 1998. 
Currently he is a PhD student at the Martin (Szusz) Department of Land of Israel Studies and Archaeology of Bar Ilan University.
He was ordained as an Orthodox Rabbi by Rabbi Dan Channen from Yeshivat Pirchei Shoshanim and by the Chief Rabbi of the city of Holon, Rabbi Eliyahu Yohanan Gur-Arieh
In 1995, he completed the International Training Course in Security Policy of the Federal Military Department of Switzerland, in Geneva.
He is fluent in Hebrew, English, French, German, Luxemburgish, Yiddish and has a good knowledge of Russian.

Publications
The Trees Sing, A Sourcebook for Tu Bi-Shevat, selected by Rabbi Moshe Edelman, edited by Joel Lion, published by the Jewish National Fund 1992
 What is really on trial in the Goldstone Report
  Israel is ready for peace, by Joel Lion, Albany Times Union, December 19, 2009
  Hoping for a reconciliation between friends, by Joel Lion, JTA, January 14, 2010 
It takes two to forge a lasting Mideast peace,by Joel Lion, NY Daily News, December 6, 2009
 Lessons Must be Learned from the Holocaust, IsraelPolitik, 04/12/2010
Israel @ 62 – “If you will it, it is no dream”, by Joel Lion, [http://www.israelpolitik.org/ IsraelPolitik], Apr. 20, 2010
Earth Day is every day in Israel. by Joel Lion, [http://www.israelpolitik.org/ IsraelPolitik], Apr. 22, 2010
Can Peace Talks Work in Face of PA Incitement?. by Joel Lion, Algemeiner Journal, May 4, 2010
 A Freeze On Mideast Politics October 5, 2010 in the Jewish Week
 The Tomb of Rachel and UNESCO November 15, 2010 in OU Shabbat Shalom Newsletter
Judah Maccabee and the Peace Process in the blog Israelpolitik, December 3, 2010
Letter to the Editor of the New York Times: Residents of Jerusalem, Published: December 4, 2010
Letter to the Editor of the New York Times:Israel and the Gaza Flotilla, Published: June 3, 2011
Libre Opinion in Le Devoir :Pour la paix de nos deux peuples, Published: September 23, 2011
Lessons for the Middle East from the Festival of Lights, Published: December 23, 2011
Holocauste - Victimes et héros, Published: January 30, 2012
Time to Cash in on the Peace Dividend, Published: April 25, 2012
Recrudescence des activités terroristes, Published: July 30, 2012
Légitime défense, Published: November 17, 2012
Joël Lion, Special to The Gazette (Montreal) :Hamas violence forcing Israel to defend itself, Published: November 21, 2012
Joël Lion, Special to the National Post :Palestinian unilateralism will solve nothing, Published: November 29, 2012
Joël Lion, Special to The Gazette (Montreal) :Opinion: Israel is not ‘bombing civilians’, Published: July 17, 2014

In the news
Joel Lion, Надзвичайний та Повноважний Посол Держави Ізраїль в Україні, з Mykola Siruk та Щоденна всеукраїнська газета «День».
Meeting the Prime Minister of Ukraine 
YNET: Praise for Israeli mission in Haiti: 'Only ones operating'
 Toronto film fest calls Israeli PR strategy into question
 Pro-Israel Ad Campaign on ‘NYT’ Website? Refutes Gaza War criticisms
 Geste der Versöhnung Berliner Studenten radeln von Sachsenhausen nach Israel
 Der popmusikalische Botschafter
 Israelsk politi holdt konserter i Tyskland
 Lithuanian, Israeli diplomats hold political consultations
Israel is inventive moving and spiritual not just about conflict
Yuri Foreman: boxing champ and rabbinical scholar
 This Rabbi-To-Be Knows How To Throw A Punch
 »In den nächsten 100 Jahren kein echter Frieden« Israelischer Botschaftsrat Joel Lion schildert seine Sicht des Nahostkonfliktes 
 „Ich liebe diese Stadt“
 New York Jews sail 'True Freedom Flotilla' for Gilad Shalit
 Shalom, Latinos!
 Local Latino, Jewish leaders gather to reaffirm bond
 Lieberman woos New York's Russians
 Israel Mountain Blaze Rages in Algemeiner, 12/04/2010
 Joel Lion - Israel's media man in The Jewish Star, 02/16/2011
 Israeli Consul General comes in like a lion in the Jewish Tribune, 30/8/2011
 New Israeli envoy formerly posted in New York in the Canadian Jewish News, 08/09/2011
 ISRAEL GIVES HISTORIC MENORAH TO ICAO
 MONTREAL WELCOMES PERES WITH LOVE AND JOY
 MFA welcomes European Parliament President's endorsement of holocaust restitution

References

External links
Embassy of Israel in Ukraine

Living people
1964 births
Yiddish-speaking people
Ambassadors of Israel to Ukraine
Israeli consuls
Hebrew University of Jerusalem Faculty of Social Sciences alumni
University of Latvia alumni
Bar-Ilan University alumni